"Ready or Not" and "Everytime" are two songs by British-Norwegian boy band A1, both taken from their first album, Here We Come (1999), and released as a double A-side single on 8 November 1999. The single peaked at  3 in the United Kingdom while "Everytime" by itself reached the same position in Norway.

Track listings
UK CD1
 "Everytime" – 4:30
 "Ready or Not" (Metro club mix) – 5:31
 "Ready or Not" (Almighty club mix) – 8:07

UK CD2
 "Ready or Not" – 3:54
 "Everytime" (acoustic) – 4:15
 "White Christmas" (acappella) – 1:07

UK cassette single
 "Everytime" – 4:30
 "Ready or Not" – 3:54

Charts

Weekly charts

Year-end charts

References

1999 singles
1999 songs
A1 (band) songs
Columbia Records singles
Songs written by Ben Adams
Songs written by Christian Ingebrigtsen
Songs written by Mark Read (singer)
Songs written by Paul Marazzi
Songs written by Peter Cunnah